Jeannine Parvati (June 1, 1949, North Hollywood, Los Angeles – December 1, 2005, Joseph, Utah), born Jeannine O'Brien, was an anti-circumcision activist, yoga teacher, midwife and author.

Parvati's first book, Prenatal Yoga & Natural Childbirth, was influenced by ashtanga yogi Baba Hari Dass. Her second, Hygieia: A Woman's Herbal was her master's thesis in psychology at San Francisco State University. Later she co-authored, with her second husband and under the last name Parvati-Baker, Conscious Conception:  Elemental Journey through the Labyrinth of Sexuality.

Parvati practiced as a midwife in Sonoma County, California for over ten years, before moving to rural southern Utah where she continued her practice and taught Prenatal Yoga while raising a family. She founded Hygieia College, a mentorship program. She is credited with popularizing the practice of lotus birth in the United States.

As a keynote speaker at conferences on genital integrity, Parvati was an advocate for eradicating circumcision. She also authored "The Wound Reveals The Cure:  A Utah Model For Ending The Cycle of Sexual Mutilation".

Parvati died at home December 1, 2005, aged 56, after a two-year battle with Hepatitis C in Utah.

Works

Various Articles and Book Reviews by Jeannine Parvati on Midwifery & Parenting topics catalogued on the Assn. of Pre & Perinatal Health's webpage.

References

1949 births
2005 deaths
Deaths from hepatitis
Infectious disease deaths in Utah
American midwives
People from Greater Los Angeles
Writers from the San Francisco Bay Area
San Francisco State University alumni
People from Sonoma County, California
20th-century American women
20th-century American people
21st-century American women